Abdoul Wahid Sissoko  (born 20 March 1990) is a French professional footballer who plays as a midfielder for Qadsia in the Kuwait Premier League.

Career
Born in Troyes, Sissoko began his career with hometown's Troyes AC. He made his professional debut on 15 August 2008, against Stade Brestois 29 for the Ligue 2 championship. Sissoko featured sparingly in his first two campaigns, but was a starter in his third, appearing in 26 matches as his side narrowly avoided relegation.

On 1 July 2011, Sissoko signed a five-year deal for Udinese. On 19 January of the following year he was loaned to Brest, after only appearing in a Coppa Italia match against Chievo Verona earlier in the month.

On 5 July 2012, Sissoko's loan was renewed. On 3 September of the following year he moved to Hércules CF also in a temporary deal.

Sissoko scored his first professional goal on 9 November 2013, netting the winner of a 2–1 home success against UD Las Palmas. He featured in 29 matches and scored three goals, as the Valencian side were relegated.

On 17 July 2014, Sissoko joined La Liga side Granada CF in a season-long loan. He made his debut in the competition on 23 August, starting in a 2–1 home win against Deportivo de La Coruña.

On 4 September 2015, free agent Sissoko signed a one-year deal with RCD Mallorca in Segunda División.

On 10 May 2018, Sissoko helped Akhisar Belediyespor win their first professional trophy, the 2017–18 Turkish Cup and scored a goal in the final.

On 10 March 2022, Sissoko signed a one-year contract with an option for a further year with Canadian Premier League side Atletico Ottawa, rejoining former Kuwait SC manager Carlos González. He departed the club following the 2022 season.

In January 2023, he signed with Kuwait Premier League club Qadsia SC.

Personal life
Sissoko's older brother, Mohamed, is also a footballer.

Honours
Akhisarspor
 Turkish Cup: 2017–18
 Turkish Super Cup: 2018

Atlético Ottawa
 Canadian Premier League Regular Season: 2022

References

External links
 
 
 
 
 

1990 births
Living people
Sportspeople from Troyes
French people of Malian descent
Footballers from Grand Est
Association football midfielders
French footballers
France youth international footballers
Ligue 1 players
Ligue 2 players
La Liga players
Segunda División players
Süper Lig players
Kuwait Premier League players
Canadian Premier League players
ES Troyes AC players
Stade Brestois 29 players
Udinese Calcio players
Hércules CF players
RCD Mallorca players
Granada CF footballers
Akhisarspor footballers
Kuwait SC players
Atlético Ottawa players
Qadsia SC players
French expatriate footballers
Expatriate footballers in Italy
French expatriate sportspeople in Italy
Expatriate footballers in Spain
French expatriate sportspeople in Spain
Expatriate footballers in Turkey
Expatriate footballers in Kuwait
French expatriate sportspeople in Kuwait
Expatriate soccer players in Canada
French expatriate sportspeople in Canada